Yenigün (also, Yenigyun) is a village in the Agstafa Rayon of Azerbaijan.  The village forms part of the municipality of Xətai.

References 

Populated places in Aghstafa District